Raed Fares (born December 6, 1982 in Gaza, Palestine) is a Palestinian professional football (soccer) player currently playing for Jerusalem side Hilal Al-Quds of the West Bank Premier League. He plays primarily as a right back, although has filled the void on the left flank with the national team in the absence of Roberto Bishara.

Fares received his first national team cap against Iran in an October 2011 friendly. He has since gone on to represent Palestine at the 2011 Pan Arab Games, 2012 AFC Challenge Cup and 2015 AFC Asian Cup.

References

Living people
Palestinian footballers
Palestine international footballers
1982 births
People from Gaza City
2015 AFC Asian Cup players
Footballers at the 2006 Asian Games
Association football defenders
Asian Games competitors for Palestine